Saranya Mohan is an Indian actress, who predominantly appeared in  Malayalam and Tamil films. She has also acted in a few Telugu, Kannada and Hindi films. She is best known for her performances in Yaaradi Nee Mohini (2008), Vennila Kabadi Kuzhu (2009), Eeram (2009), Velayudham (2011) and Osthe (2011).

Early life

Saranya is the eldest daughter of Mohan and Kalamandalam Devi. She has a younger sister named Sukanya who is also trained classical dancer. Both her parents are trained classical dancers and dance teachers, who together run a dance school, Y.K.B Dance Academy  in Alappuzha, where Saranya   herself also learnt dancing bharatanatyam. She studied at St. Joseph's College for Women, Alappuzha, completing her B. A. degree in English literature. After completing MA in English Literature from Annamalai University, Chidambaram she completed MFA in Bharatanatyam from the same university.

Career

She was brought to light by Malayalam director Fazil, who had seen Saranya dancing at her dancing school. After approaching and persuading her parents, he cast her for a child character in the 1997 Malayalam film Aniyathi Pravu and its Tamil remake, Kadhalukku Mariyadhai. Next she made appearance as a child artist in the hit Malayalam movie Harikrishnans with Mammootty, Mohanlal and Juhi Chawla  in lead roles. Then she also was seen as a child artist in yet another Malayalam movie Rakthasakshikal Sindabad with Mohanlal and Suresh Gopi. Then she took a break, concentrating on her studies, before enacting a supporting role in another Fazil directorial, Oru Naal Oru Kanavu (2005), in which she acted as a sister to the male lead character.

Her subsequent release, the Dhanush-Nayantara starrer Yaaradi Nee Mohini (2008), brought her into limelight. Her comedic performance as the younger sister to the lead female, who has a crush on her sister's love interest, won her fame and many accolades. She subsequently appeared in 3 more Tamil films in 2008, which, however, were less successful. These included the 1st one Jayamkondaan, next was Mahesh, Saranya Matrum Palar & finally Panchamirtham along with Jayaram . In year 2009, she had six releases, four of which being Tamil projects. Out of her Tamil releases, the tragedy sports film, Vennila Kabadi Kuzhu, directed by debutante Suseenthiran, and the supernatural thriller Eeram proved to be commercially as well as critically successful. The other two Tamil movies were A Aa E Ee with Prabhu  Sir & another Tamil movie was Arumugham with Bharath and Priyamani in lead roles. Later that year, she made her Telugu debut with Village Lo Vinayakudu and made her comeback to Malayalam films, starring in Chemistry. She also did the Telugu remake of her Tamil movie titled Bheemili Kabaddi Jattu in 2010, which also did well in the box office. Then she did one more Telugu movie Happy Happy Ga the same year. Start of the year 2011 she did a Malayalam movie Ponnu Kondoru Aalroopam. Next was yet another Malayalam movie Nadakame Ulakam along with Mukesh, Vinu Mohan and Sarayu Mohan. Then she did a cameo role in the Tamil movie Azhagarsamiyin Kuthirai same year. In 2011 she also acted in M.Raja's Velayudham, which turned out to be a huge hit. Her role as Vijay's sister won her a lot of good reviews. Same year later she did a Malayalam movie Innanu Aa Kalyanam. She also acted in another film named Dharani's Osthe in the end of 2011 with Simbu in lead role. Then she had an entry to Kannada same year with her debut Kannada movie Ee Bhoomi Aa Bhanu. Then she went on to do a Tamil movie Kolagalam. In 2014 she did her 2nd Kannada movie Paramashiva starring V. Ravichandran Sir too. She continued her career with a Tamil movie Kadhalai Thavira Verondrum Illai. Then the same year she made her Bollywood debut with Badlapur Boys opposite Nishan which was the Hindi remake of her hit Tamil movie Vennila Kabadi Kuzhu. Now in year 2015 she completed yet another Tamil movie Suyam, which is yet to be released.

Personal life

Saranya married her longtime boyfriend Dr.Aravind Krishnan on 6 September 2015 at Kottamkulangara Devi Temple, Alappuzha.
They have a son named Anantapadmanabhan Aravind and a daughter named Annapoorna Aravind.

Filmography

TV serials
2008 Meera (Asianet) as Meera 
2006 Swami Ayyappan (Asianet) as Malikapurathamma 
2007 Manassariyathe (Surya TV) 
2005 Krishnakripasagaram (Amrita TV) as Ambai Pennu 
2007 Mounanombaram (Kairali TV) 
2007 Aa Amma (Kairali TV)

TV shows
Nuvvu Nenu - Telugu game show
Parayam Nedam - Malayalam game show
Celebrity Taste - Malayalam cookery show
Vivel Big Break - Malayalam reality show
Red Carpet - Malayalam reality show
Panam Tharum Padam  - Malayalam game show

Endorsements
Kalyan Jewellers
 Wedland Silks & Sareees
 AVR
 Pampers

References

External links
   
  
 https://youtube.com/SaranyaMohanOfficial
 
Actress Saranya Mohan Wedding Photos

Actresses in Tamil cinema
Actresses in Malayalam cinema
Actresses from Alappuzha
Actresses in Telugu cinema
Actresses in Kannada cinema
Living people
Indian film actresses
21st-century Indian actresses
Indian television actresses
Actresses in Malayalam television
Child actresses in Malayalam cinema
20th-century Indian actresses
Year of birth missing (living people)
Annamalai University alumni
University of Kerala alumni